Scabrotrophon regina is a species of sea snail, a marine gastropod mollusk in the family Muricidae, the murex snails or rock snails.

Description

Distribution
This marine species occurs off the Philippines.

References

 Houart, R. (1986). Mollusca Gastropoda: Noteworthy Muricidae from the Pacific Ocean, with description of seven new species. in: Forest, J. (Ed.) Résultats des Campagnes MUSORSTOM I et II Philippines (1976, 1980). Tome 2. Mémoires du Muséum national d'Histoire naturelle. Série A, Zoologie. 133: 427-455. 

Gastropods described in 1985
Scabrotrophon